Caramel Pictures is a production agency with offices in Amsterdam, London, and Miami. Formerly known as Will van der Vlugt Film Productions, it was renamed to Caramel Pictures in 2007.

History
In 1977, Dutch stills photographer Will van der Vlugt moves to film production and founds Will van der Vlugt Film Productions after a career as an advertising photographer. The agency grows out to produce for the international market, working with ad agencies all over the world and creating output for many companies and brands in different countries. In 2007 the company gets renamed to Caramel Pictures. The company has grown since its start, with offices set up in Amsterdam, London, Miami, Dubai, and Mumbai. The Amsterdam and London offices cater the European market, whereas Miami targets North and South America. Dubai went on to produce for its own domestic market, but discontinued its shop in 2010. In 2012, Caramel Pictures opened another hub in Mumbai to cater the Indian market. The company now has five offices, houses nine directors and has one of the biggest film studios of the Netherlands set up in Amsterdam.

Commercials

Throughout the years, Caramel Pictures has produced hundreds of commercials for different countries, brands, and products. Moreover, Caramel Pictures has been involved in different charitable ventures as well as moved into the production of films. Among the commercials Caramel Pictures has created are the award-winning Centraal Beheer campaigns, produced for a Dutch insurance company. Other brands produced for include Hyundai, Ford, Nescafé, Lindt, Amnesty International, McDonald's, and many others.

Films

In 2010, Caramel Pictures partnered with the NPS, Parasar, and Sophie Animation to produce the award-winning short film Broken Moon (original title: De Maan is Kapot). Directed by Arno Dierickx, it went on to win the Golden Calf for 'best short film' at the Netherlands Film Festival in 2010, as well as gathering notable attention on various international film festivals.

Directors
In 2013, Caramel Pictures represents nine directors. They are: Will van der Vlugt, Ronald Koetzier, Marcel van der Vlugt, Arno Dierickx, Andreas Grassl, Devon Dickson, Stuart MacLeod, Greg Francois, and Kevin Hewitt.

XS by Caramel Pictures
In 2009, Caramel Pictures went on to form XS by Caramel Pictures. Via this brand, the company produces commercial work on a minimum budget, and promote the use of various platforms of advertising, such as narrowcasting, internet, video walls, and other new media.

Awards
 Golden Lion for Centraal Beheer – The Box at the Cannes Lions International Advertising Festival.
 Silver Lion for Centraal Beheer – Rebel at the Cannes Lions International Advertising Festival.
 Silver Lion for Centraal Beheer – Hedgehog at the Cannes Lions International Advertising Festival.
 Grand Prix for the Centraal Beheer campaign at the New York Film Festival.

External links
 http://www.caramelpictures.com
 https://web.archive.org/web/20110208220852/http://xsbycaramelpictures.com/
 http://www.studioscossa.com
 Bat Mitzvah Photography

References

Film studios